Lannacus is an extinct genus from a well-known class of fossil marine arthropods, the trilobites. It lived during the Arenig stage of the Ordovician Period, approximately 478 to 471 million years ago.

References

Asaphida genera
Ordovician trilobites